State Penitentiary is a 1950 American drama film directed by Lew Landers and starring Warner Baxter (in his last film role) and Onslow Stevens. The film's prison scenes were photographed at the state penitentiary at Carson City, Nevada.

Plot summary
Roger Manners, a former aircraft manufacturer, is wrongly convicted of having embezzled $400,000 and is given a long prison sentence. His wife Shirley tries to prove his innocence. Manners escapes, hoping to track down the real culprit, his former partner Stanley Brown.

Cast
 Warner Baxter as Roger Manners 
 Onslow Stevens as Richard Evans 
 Karin Booth as Shirley Manners 
 Robert Shayne as Stanley Brown 
 Richard Benedict as Mike Gavin 
 Brett King as Al 'Kid' Beaumont 
 John Bleifer as Jailbreak Jimmy 
 Leo Cleary as Warden-Narrator (as Leo T. Cleary) 
 Rick Vallin as Tom – Prison Guard 
 Rusty Wescoatt as 'Flash' Russell – Convict 
 William Fawcett as Bill Costello – Convict 
 John Hart as 'Sandy' O'Hara – Convict 
 Jack Ingram as Construction Gang Guard

References

External links 
 
 
 

1950 films
American drama films
Films directed by Lew Landers
1950 drama films
Films shot in Nevada
Columbia Pictures films
American black-and-white films
1950s English-language films
1950s American films